Rambha may refer to:
Rambha (apsara), Hindu mythology
Rambha (asura), king of the Hindu asura demons; once he fell in love with a water buffalo, and Mahishasura was born out of this union
Rambha (actress) (born 1976), Indian film actress
Rambha, Orissa, town in southeast India

Feminine given names